Lepidoblepharis williamsi is a species of gecko, a lizard in the family Sphaerodactylidae. The species is endemic to Colombia.

Etymology
The specific name, williamsi, is in honor of American herpetologist Ernest Edward Williams.

Geographic range
L. williamsi is found in Antioquia Department, Colombia.

Description
It usually has rust-colored dorsolateral tail stripes.

Reproduction
L. williamsi is oviparous.

References

Further reading
Ayala, Stephen C.; Serna, Marco Antonio (1986). "Una nueva especie de Lepidoblepharis (Sauria, Gekkonidae) de la Cordillera Central de Colombia ". Caldasia 15 (71-75): 649–654. (Lepidoblepharis williamsi, new species). (in Spanish, with an abstract in English).

Lepidoblepharis
Reptiles described in 1986